The 1987 French Figure Skating Championships took place in Épinal for singles and pairs and in Dijon for ice dance. Skaters competed in the disciplines of men's singles, women's singles, pair skating, and ice dancing on the senior level. The event was used to help determine the French team to the 1987 World Championships and the 1987 European Championships.

Results

Men

Ladies

Pairs

Ice dance

External links
 French article

1986 in figure skating
French Figure Skating Championships, 1987
French Figure Skating Championships
1987 in French sport